Robert Howell may refer to:

 Robert B. Howell (1864–1933), U.S. senator from Nebraska
 Robert Howell (cricketer) (1877–1942), English cricketer
 Rob Howell, British costume and set designer